In the mathematical theory of probability, a Borel right process, named after Émile Borel, is a particular kind of continuous-time random process.

Let  be a locally compact, separable, metric space.
For each , let

 

 

and then, let

 

 

 

Here, 
 is the completion of
 with respect
to the product measure . 
the mapping  is Lebeague measurable, and hence, 
for each , one can define

 

which uniquely associated with the Markovian semigroup . 
Consequently, one may apply Fubini's theorem to see that

 

The following are the defining properties of Borel right processes:

 Hypothesis Droite 1:

 Hypothesis Droite 2:

Notes

References

Stochastic processes